Frank Ritter may refer to:

Frank Ritter (psychologist), professor at Pennsylvania State University
Frank Ritter (entrepreneur), founder of The Ritter Company and contributor to a forerunner of the Rochester Institute of Technology
Frank Ritter Memorial Ice Arena on the RIT campus, named after the above person
Frank Ritter Shumway, ice skating official, grandson of the entrepreneur.